The 2015–16 Professional U21 Development League is the fourth season of the Professional Development League system.

League 1 

League 1, referred to as the Barclays Under 21 Premier League for sponsorship reasons, was split into two divisions, with teams allocated places in Division 1 or 2 based on their performance in the 2014–15 season.

At the end of the season, the team which finished top of Division 1 was crowned as overall League 1 champions, and the bottom two teams in Division 1 will be relegated to Division 2 for the 2016–17 season.

Division 1

Table

Results

Division 2

Table

Results

Play-offs

League 2 

League 2, referred to as the U21 Professional Development League 2, is split into two regional divisions.

Teams will play each team in their own division twice, and each team in the other division once, for a total of 30 games for North division teams, and 29 games each for South division teams.

At the end of the season, the teams finishing in the top two positions of both divisions will meet in the knockout stage to determine the overall league champion.

League stage

North Division table

South Division table

Results

Knock-out stage

Semifinals

Final

See also
 2015–16 Professional U18 Development League
 2015–16 FA Cup
 2015–16 FA Youth Cup
 2015–16 Under-21 Premier League Cup
 2015–16 in English football

References

2015–16 in English football leagues
2015-16